{{Infobox military conflict
| conflict    = Second Serbian Uprising
| partof      = Serbian Revolution
| image       = Paja Jovanovic-Takovski ustanak.jpg
| image_size  = 285px
| caption     = The Takovo Uprising (1889), by Paja Jovanović
| date        = 23 April 1815 – 26 July 1817()
| place       = Sanjak of Smederevo
| territory   = Ottoman Empire loses control of the Sanjak of Smederevo
| result      = Strategic Serbian diplomatic victory; Establishment of the autonomous Principality of Serbia
| combatant1  =  Serbian rebels
| combatant2  =  Ottoman Empire
| commander1  = 
| commander2  = {{Plainlist |
 Maraşlı Ali Pasha
 Sulejman Pasha
 Hurşid Pasha Ibrahim-Pasa Osman-beg Seuchesmu Caja-Imšir Kara-Mustafa}}
| strength1   = At beginning 1,700 later 15,000 men and 3 cannons 
| strength2   = 17,000 later reinforcement 30,000 soldiers
| casualties1 = Over 2,500 killed
| casualties2 = Over 10,000 killed, around 1,000's Turks and 1,000's Arnauts captured later released
| notes       = 
}}

The Second Serbian Uprising' ( / Drugi srpski ustanak) was the second phase of the Serbian Revolution against the Ottoman Empire, which erupted shortly after the re-annexation of the country to the Ottoman Empire in 1813. The occupation was enforced following the defeat of the First Serbian Uprising (1804–1813), during which Serbia existed as a de facto independent state for over a decade. The second revolution ultimately resulted in Serbian semi-independence from the Ottoman Empire. The Principality of Serbia was established, governed by its own parliament, constitution and royal dynasty. De jure independence, however, was attained in 1878, following the decisions of the Congress of Berlin.

Background

The First Serbian Uprising liberated the country for a significant time (1804–1813) from the Ottoman Empire; for the first time in three centuries, Serbs governed themselves without the supremacy of the Ottoman Empire or Habsburg Austria. After the failure of the First Serbian Uprising 1813, most commanders escaped to the Habsburg Monarchy, including Karađorđe Petrović, leader of the First Serbian Uprising.

Only a few commanders Miloš Obrenović, Stanoje Glavaš etc. remained in Serbia trying by one specific diplomatic way to protect and share the destiny of the local people.

Miloš Obrenović surrendered to the Ottoman Turks and received the title of "obor-knez" ("senior leader"). Stanoje Glavaš also surrendered to the Turks and was made a supervisor of a road, but the Turks killed him after they became suspicious of him. Hadži Prodan Gligorijević knew the Turks would arrest him and so declared an uprising in 1814, but Obrenović felt the time was not right for an uprising and did not provide assistance.

Hadži Prodan's Uprising soon failed and he fled to Austria. After the failure of this revolt, the Turks inflicted more persecution against the Serbs, such as high taxation, forced labor, and rape. In March 1815, Serbs had several meetings and decided upon a new revolt.

Uprising

The national council proclaimed open revolt against the Ottoman Empire in Takovo on 23 April 1815. Miloš Obrenović was chosen as the leader and famously spoke, "Here I am, here you are. War to the Turks!" Serbian: "Evo mene, evo vas. Rat Turcima!". When the Ottomans discovered the new revolt they sentenced all of its leaders to death. The Serbs fought in battles at Rudnik, Ljubić, Palež, Valjevo, Čačak, Karanovac, Požarevac, Kragujevac, Jagodina, and Dublje and drove the Ottomans out of the Pashalik of Belgrade.

In mid-1815, the first negotiations began between Miloš Obrenović and Marashli Ali Pasha, the Ottoman governor. Miloš Obrenović got a form of partial autonomy for Serbs, and, in 1816, the Turkish Porte signed several documents for the normalization of relations between Serbs and Turks. The result was the acknowledgment of the Principality of Serbia by the Ottoman Empire. Miloš Obrenović received the title of Prince of Serbia. Although the principality paid a yearly tax to the Porte and had a garrison of Ottoman troops in Belgrade until 1867, it was, in most other matters, an independent state. Under the grandson of Miloš's brother, Milan, Serbia gained formal independence in 1878 under the Treaty of Berlin.

In 1817, Miloš Obrenović succeeded in forcing Marashli Ali Pasha to negotiate an unwritten agreement, an act which effectively ended the Second Serbian uprising. The same year, Karađorđe, the leader of the First Uprising, returned to Serbia and was assassinated.

Aftermath

Serbia's semi-independence was reaffirmed by a Ferman from the Porte in 1830, and in 1835 the first constitution in the Balkans was written in the Principality of Serbia.  It introduced the Serbian Parliament on the regular basis and established the Obrenović dynasty as the legal heir to the throne of Serbia. It also described Serbia as an independent parliamentary Principality, which outraged the  Ottoman Empire and the Habsburg monarchy.

See also

History of the Serbian-Turkish wars

References

Sources

 
 
 
 

External links

John R. Lampe: Yugoslavia as History - Twice there was a Country'', Cambridge University Press, 1996.

 
Serb rebellions against the Ottoman Empire
Ottoman Serbia
Second Uprising
Wars of independence
1810s in Serbia
Second Uprising
Second Uprising
Second Uprising
19th-century rebellions
Conflicts in 1815
Conflicts in 1816
Conflicts in 1817